Karen Anette Stai, born 24 March 1961, is a Norwegian model. She was one of the top fashion models in the 1980s. Stai won the first Supermodel of the World contest in 1980.

After a few years of working as a model Stai felt burnt out. She was offered a contract with L'Oréal but decided to quit being a model. She has since worked as a fashion photographer and fashion editor, and has authored books.

She is married to Jan-Eric Arnesen. She has one son with Arnesen, one from a previous relationship and two stepsons.

Published works
Crazy business - photo model Diary (1983)
In the midst of life: Living with seeing yourself and others (2003)

References

1961 births
Living people
Norwegian female models
Norwegian emigrants to the United States